The 1975 Washington Star International was a men's tennis tournament and was played on outdoor clay courts. It was categorized as an AA tournament and was part of the 1975 Grand Prix circuit. It was the seventh edition of the tournament and was held in Washington, D.C. from July 21 through July 28, 1975. Guillermo Vilas won the singles title and $16,000 prize money and a car in a final that was twice interrupted due to rain. Total attendance during the tournament was 55,000.

Ilie Năstase was disqualified in his quarterfinal match against Cliff Richey for failing to resume play.

Finals

Singles
 Guillermo Vilas defeated  Harold Solomon 6–1, 6–3
 It was Vilas' 3rd singles title of the year and the 11th of his career.

Doubles
 Bob Lutz /  Stan Smith defeated  Brian Gottfried /  Raúl Ramírez 7–5, 2–6, 6–1

References

External links
 ATP tournament profile
 ITF tournament edition details

Washington Open (tennis)
Washington Star International
Washington Star International
Washington Star International